The Sebright is a breed of chicken.

Sebright may also refer to: 

 Sebright, Ontario, Canada
 Sebright baronets, a title in the Baronetage of England
 Sebright School in Wolverley, Worcestershire, England, now Heathfield Knoll School

People with the surname
 Danny Sebright (born 1961), president of the U.S.-U.A.E. Business Council
 Georgina Mary Sebright, Lady Sebright (1833–1874), British Balkan sympathiser and writer
 John Sebright (disambiguation)
 Sir Thomas Sebright, 4th Baronet (1692–1736), British landowner and politician
 William Sebright (died 1692), Town Clerk of London who founded the Sebright School in Wolverley, Worcestershire, England

See also
 Operation Seabight, the 2008 seizure of cocaine off the coast of Ireland
 Sea Bright, New Jersey, United States
 Seabright, Nova Scotia, Canada